Tomáš Méry (Bratislava, 26 August 1990) is a Slovak professional ice hockey player.

In 2012 he played in Poland. He previously played with clubs including HC Slovan Bratislava in the Slovak Extraliga.

External links

References

Living people
HC Slovan Bratislava players
Ice hockey people from Bratislava
1990 births
Slovak ice hockey forwards
Slovak expatriate ice hockey players in Germany
Slovak expatriate sportspeople in Poland
Expatriate ice hockey players in Poland